Strike Me Lucky is a 1934 Australian comedy musical film starring popular stage comic Roy Rene in his first and only film. It was the fourth feature film from Cinesound Productions but proved a box office disappointment. Director Ken G. Hall says it was the only one of his features not to go into profit within a few years of release, although he says it eventually covered costs.

Synopsis
'Mo' McIsaac and his sidekick Donald try to find work to support a young orphan girl he finds dancing for pennies in the street, Miriam, unaware she is really the missing daughter of rich aristocrat, Major Burnett. Gangster Al Baloney and Mae West impersonator Kate kidnap the girl and Mo is blamed for her disappearance.

Mo and Donald take off into the bush looking for a gold mine (a storyline inspired by the 1930 expedition to find Lasseter's Reef), where they are attacked by a tribe of aboriginal cannibals before discovering their names are cleared. Other plots include a young couple, Margot Burnett and Larry McCormack, finding love, and a ballet of dancers performs periodically.

Cast

Roy Rene as 'Mo' McIsaac
Alex McKinnon as Donald
'Baby' Pamela Bevan as Miriam
Eric Masters as Al Baloney
Yvonne Banvard as Kate
John D'Arcy as Larry McCormack
Lorraine Smith as Margot Burnett
Dan Agar as Major Burnett
Molly Raynor as Bates
Bert Le Blanc as Lowenstein
Les Warton as Bull
Harry Burgess as Mike
Fred Kelly as castaway
Marie D'Alton as Mrs Huckleberry
Arthur Dodds
Charles Wheeler
Jack O'Malley
Charles Keegan
Nellie Small
Eva Sheedy

Production

Development
In the early 1930s, Roy Rene was one of the most popular stage comics in Australia. Bert Bailey and George Wallace had managed to transfer their on-stage popularity to the screen in a series of films, so Ken G. Hall thought he would try to do the same for Rene. Hall later wrote:
The luck we'd had with our first three films all hitting the jackpot was phenomenal. The odds against getting a second winner after The Selection were high in those still-tough times; but to bring in the third filled our cups to overflowing – and scared us a bit at the same time. That sort of luck just could not last. It didn't.
The movie would be Cinesound's fourth feature film. Hall originally intended to make Robbery Under Arms but was concerned about filming that during winter and so postponed the project, electing to make the Rene film instead. (Robbery Under Arms ended up never being made by Hall.)

The original title was Swastikas for Luck, and was described as "a musical farce with a semi-serious background". It was to "feature many phases of suburban and bush life in Australia".

Script
It was the first movie from Cinesound Productions that was not based on a play adapted from a novel, being an entirely original story. Hall later said he was "desperately short of writers, especially comedy writers" so he assigned theteam of Vic Roberts and George D. Parker, who had just written Cinesound Varieties for Hall; Roberts had worked as Rene's gag writer and Parker had theatrical experience. Roberts also wrote some lyrics for songs used in the movie, while Parker doubled as dialogue director.

Hall admitted there were three different scripts. He later reflected:
The Parker-Roberts combination did not do well on the Varieties script and I should have made changes for the much more important Strike Me Lucky film. The script was full of ridiculous situations which we all thought would suit Mo. I had then, and I'm afraid still have, a highly developed sense of the ridiculous. Maybe too highly developed because that brand of humour does not appeal to everyone, although it worked so well with George Wallace.

Casting
Cast member 'Baby' Pamela Bevan was only five years old and was advertised as "Australia's Shirley Temple". The female ingenue part was played by 18-year-old actor from amateur theatre and an acting family, Lorraine Smith.

Shooting
Cinesound almost doubled the size of their studio to make the film, and also in anticipation for what they thought would be a boost in production following the introduction of a film quota.

Shooting took place in June and July 1934, going for seven weeks. Over a hundred extras were used in some scenes, a record for Australian interiors. The musical numbers done by Hamilton Webber, musical director of the State Theatre, Sydney; the ballets choreographed by Richard White.

Rene was paid £70 a week for his performance, which was high for an Australian actor in films, third only to Bert Bailey and George Wallace. He later admitted he did not enjoy acting on film as he missed the stimulation of a live performance and disliked the repetition.

On 18 August, scenes from the film were broadcast nationally as part of a promotion.

Reception
The movie's world premiere was held in October 1934 coinciding with the opening of the extension of Cinesound's Studios at Waverly. NSW Premier Bertram Stevens was present.

The film was refused registration under the quality clause of the New South Wales quota act, but still found release through Cinesound's associated company, British Empire Films.

Critical
Reviews were not strong. The critic from The Sydney Morning Herald stated that:
One must, in fairness, record the fact that...[the] audience... seemed to enjoy the film immensely. Every new exploit by "Mo" created a running fire of laughter.... [But] He is a good deal less funny than before. On the stage he gained most of his effects through a partly extempore style. He would play straight at the audience, and wait patiently, wearing his inimitably grotesque expression, until each roar of mirth had died away. But... the cinema audience and the figure photographed on celluloid exist in different worlds. Picture-goers can scream their heads off, yet the film sweeps onward heedless and detached. That is why the antics of "Mo" now seem rather artificial, not to say forced. An experienced director of Hollywood farce could perhaps have reshaped the comedian's style to fit the new medium; but Mr. Ken Hall has made only an amateurish job of things... all the actors have the air of novices in a suburban repertory show. As for the plot and the dialogue, one had best relapse into a resigned silence.... Brings in kangaroos and emus and incredible burlesque aborigines for the mere sake of showing them. A good deal of American influence comes in, too. For no discoverable reason Miss Yvonne Banvard goes through her part in exact and avowed impersonation of Mae West. The gangsters all talk American slang.

Box office
The film was not a success at the box office, despite a strong reception at first, particularly in Sydney and Melbourne. (It earned £1,817 in its first four days at the Sydney Capitol.) Director Ken G. Hall claims it was the only one of his films not to go straight into profit, blaming the poor script and Roy Rene's awkwardness in front of the camera as opposed to a live audience:
Rene himself was in some trouble right from the beginning. In a film studio with no audience, he was something of a fish out of water. No performer I've ever known had the ability to 'work' an audience as Mo could. He'd come on centre stage with no support and just leer at the audience without saying a word for minutes on end and have them rocking with laughter. And when the laughs began to die, he'd lisp in his inimitable way a completely trite line like, 'Will you be quiet, pleath!' – and that would send them off for minutes more. An established comic, a really funny man to the audience, can get laughs by appearing to do nothing at all. Actually he is 'working' all the time – with a look, a raised eyebrow, a sly, suggestive wink, a haughty smile. Mo was a past-master of all that, and much more of course. But he did need an audience. In rehearsal of a funny scene the crew would laugh the first time they saw and heard it. But on the next rehearsal and the next and the next ... nothing. It depressed Mo tremendously. I had seen him rehearsing in the theatre a few times and he just casually walked through, usually waiting for the matinee with a live audience to get the feel of what he was doing. There were some very funny scenes in Strike Me Lucky, but we did not get the best out of Mo overall, mainly because the material was not there – and he was rather at sea himself. This problem characterised many prominent vaudeville comedians transferring to film or television ...
He also felt that Rene was too adult in his humor. "He was a very funny man, wonderfully talented", said Hall later. "But he wasn't a 'family' comic. You didn't take the kids."

UK release
A shortened version was released in England but attracted little attention.

Legacy
Although Rene had a contract with Cinesound for further films he never made another movie in his life. However he did manage to modify his performance style to enjoy considerable success on radio.

The box office disappointment of the film prompted Hall to return to more sure-fire material for his next film with Grandad Rudd (1935).

References

Hall, Ken G. Directed by Ken G. Hall, Lansdowne Press 1977

External links
Strike Me Lucky in the Internet Movie Database
Strike Me Lucky at Australian Screen Online
'Strike Me Lucky: Social Difference and Consumer Culture in Roy Rene's Only Film'  by Lesley Speed at Senses of Cinema Issue 52
Strike Me Lucky at National Film and Sound Archive
Strike Me Lucky at Oz Movies
Strike Me Lucky at Peter Malone
Strike Me Lucky at Australian Variety Theatre Archive

1934 films
Films directed by Ken G. Hall
Australian black-and-white films
Australian musical comedy films
1934 musical comedy films
1930s Australian films
1930s English-language films
Cinesound Productions films